Joanne Cara Deakins (born 20 November 1972) is an English former competitive swimmer.

Swimming career
Deakins specialised in the backstroke and represented Great Britain at the 1992 Olympic Games in Barcelona and the 1996 Olympic Games in Atlanta.

She represented England in the 100 metres and 200 metres backstroke and won a silver medal in the 4 x 100 metres medley relay, at the 1990 Commonwealth Games in Auckland, New Zealand. Four years later she swam in the 200 metres backstroke event at the 1994 Commonwealth Games and repeated the achievement a further four years later in her third Games, which was the 1998 Commonwealth Games. In addition to her Olympic and Commonwealth Games success she won the bronze medal in the 200 metres backstroke at the 1995 Universiade.

International competitions

References

1972 births
Living people
Commonwealth Games silver medallists for England
English backstroke swimmers
Olympic swimmers of Great Britain
Sportspeople from Worcester, England
Swimmers at the 1992 Summer Olympics
Swimmers at the 1996 Summer Olympics
English female swimmers
Female backstroke swimmers
Swimmers at the 1990 Commonwealth Games
Swimmers at the 1994 Commonwealth Games
Swimmers at the 1998 Commonwealth Games
Commonwealth Games medallists in swimming
Universiade medalists in swimming
Universiade bronze medalists for Great Britain
Medalists at the 1995 Summer Universiade
Medallists at the 1990 Commonwealth Games